Carleton is a village in Monroe County in the U.S. state of Michigan. The population was 2,326 at the 2020 census.  The village is located within Ash Township.

History
The community was first platted in 1872 by Daniel Matthews, who also worked previously to select Lansing as the state capital.  He became the first postmaster when the Carleton post office was established on February 24, 1874.  The community was named after Will Carleton, who was a local poet.  The community centered along a railway line first built by the Pere Marquette Railway and a junction with Canada Southern Railway, as well as the nearby Pennsylvania Railroad.  The village incorporated in 1911.

Geography

Demographics

2000 census
As of the census of 2000, there were 2,562 people, 998 households, and 677 families living in the village. The racial makeup of the village was 96.72% White, 0.04% African American, 0.43% Native American, 0.23% Asian, 0.31% from other races, and 2.26% from two or more races. Hispanic or Latino of any race were 1.87% of the population.

There were 998 households, out of which 35.1% had children under the age of 18 living with them, 48.5% were married couples living together, 13.6% had a female householder with no husband present, and 32.1% were non-families. 26.8% of all households were made up of individuals, and 10.1% had someone living alone who was 65 years of age or older. The average household size was 2.57 and the average family size was 3.12.

In the village, the population was spread out, with 28.4% under the age of 18, 9.7% from 18 to 24, 30.5% from 25 to 44, 20.7% from 45 to 64, and 10.7% who were 65 years of age or older.  The median age was 33 years. For every 100 females, there were 97.4 males.  For every 100 females age 18 and over, there were 92.0 males.

The median income for a household in the village was $44,205, and the median income for a family was $50,000. Males had a median income of $41,289 versus $26,531 for females. The per capita income for the village was $20,394.  About 9.6% of families and 10.6% of the population were below the poverty line, including 12.2% of those under age 18 and 13.1% of those age 65 or over.

2010 census

As of the census of 2010, there were 2,345 people, 953 households, and 631 families living in the village. The racial makeup of the village was 96.7% White, 0.2% African American, 0.5% Native American, 0.7% Asian, 0.1% Pacific Islander, 0.2% from other races, and 1.7% from two or more races. Hispanic or Latino of any race were 2.0% of the population.

There were 953 households, of which 34.5% had children under the age of 18 living with them, 45.9% were married couples living together, 13.3% had a female householder with no husband present, 7.0% had a male householder with no wife present, and 33.8% were non-families. 28.2% of all households were made up of individuals, and 10.4% had someone living alone who was 65 years of age or older. The average household size was 2.46 and the average family size was 3.02.

The median age in the village was 37.2 years. 25% of residents were under the age of 18; 8.5% were between the ages of 18 and 24; 27.3% were from 25 to 44; 27.3% were from 45 to 64; and 12% were 65 years of age or older. The gender makeup of the village was 49.6% male and 50.4% female.

Education 
The village of Carleton is served by Airport Community Schools.

Images

References

Villages in Monroe County, Michigan
Villages in Michigan
Populated places established in 1872
1872 establishments in Michigan